The  ETR 240 (meaning Fast Electric Train, series 240) is an Italian electric multiple unit (EMU) introduced in the 1980s.

Development

In the 1930s, the Italian state railways, Ferrovie dello Stato, electrified the main line Milan-Bologna-Florence-Rome-Naples and needed a fast train to use on it and on other newly electrified ones.  The first ETR 200 was built by Società Italiana Ernesto Breda, (now AnsaldoBreda), in 1936, with three cars on four bogies, two of which had a single T 62-R-100 motor while the others were provided with two similar motors each.  The ETR 200 entered in service in 1937.  In the early 1960s the remaining sixteen ETR 200 units were converted to ETR 220 by adding a fourth car and other changes.  

The ETR 240 entered in service in the late 1980s and remained in service until the late 1990s and were used for charter trains up and in the  Civitavecchia  -Rome line.

There  were obtained by modification (mainly in interior trims and contents) of 6 of ETR220 (AV version).

References

ETR 240
Breda multiple units
Italian streamliner trains
3000 V DC multiple units